Big Black Delta is a solo project of Mellowdrone vocalist/bassist Jonathan Bates.

History 
Bates began the project in 2010 after becoming frustrated with the logistics of a band. Thanks to help from Alessandro Cortini, of Nine Inch Nails, he discovered the possibilities of producing music on a laptop and quickly set about building a new sound.

In 2013, Bates released his self-titled album, Big Black Delta. The album contained a mixture of fresh material and songs released on BBDLP1. The album was released on Bates' own label, Masters of Bates, and was inspired by the soundtracks of Blade Runner and Solaris. It was positively received by critics and was compared by one reviewer to music from Muse and The Joy Formidable. Remixes of songs from the album have since come from Jimmy Edgar, John Tejada, Azari & III and Martyn. The video for "Side of the Road" was directed by Warren Kommers, inspired by Bates' love of astrophysics and astronomy.

Big Black Delta has collaborated with a number of other artists such as War Widow, Alessandro Cortini, Susanne Sundfør, Morgan Kibby, and Poison The Well drummer Chris Hornbrook, acting as touring drummer. He has received praise from Jay-Z on his blog, Life+Times, and played in support of Gary Numan, M83 and Jane's Addiction on their tours.

In 2016, Big Black Delta released his third album, Trágame Tierra. The album was financed via PledgeMusic, a music-focused crowdsourcing website, which allowed Big Black Delta to release the album independently. The album contains collaborations with Debbie Gibson on "RCVR" and Kimbra on "Bitten by the Apple"; it was followed by a North American headlining tour.

Big Black Delta's fourth album, the all-instrumental WHORU812, was released on eOne Music Canada in June 2017. Prior to the album's release, Bates announced there would be only one live performance from Big Black Delta in 2017, to be played at The Viaduct in Los Angeles on July 14.

His songs "Huggin & Kissin" and "Capsize" were used in the 2017 USA Network show The Sinner starring Jessica Biel.

On January 31, 2020, Bates and fellow Los Angeles band Sego (who previously toured in support of Big Black Delta) released a split cover EP called "Quid Pro Quo," that saw Sego covering the Big Black Delta song "Into The Night," and Bates covering Sego's song "Shame." The released this digitally and as a limited run of 500 flexi discs.

On March 20, 2020, Big Black Delta released the single, "Summoner," off of his upcoming forth album. It was accompanied by a music video directed by Warren Kommers and Nina McNeely. This followed by remixes for "Summoner" from James Welsh, Clearside, and The Bodies Obtained.

On May 15, 2020, Big Black Delta announced the release of the fourth LP 4 on July 10, 2020 and released the single "Lord Only Knows," with its accompanying music video directed by Adam Osgood. On June 12, "Canary," the third single from 4, was released. He released his fourth studio album, 4, on July 10, 2020, alongside a video for album track "Vessel" (another collaboration with Warren Kommers.)

Big Black Delta had two original songs featured on the soundtrack for Bill & Ted Face The Music, released on August 28, 2020.

Discography

 Albums
 BBDLP1 (2011)
 Big Black Delta (2013)
 Trágame Tierra (2016)
 WHORU812 (2017)
 4 (2020)

EPs
 BBDEP1 (2010)
 EP2.5A7 (2013)
 Quid Pro Quo (2020) (split release w/ Sego)

Singles
 2010: "He's A Whore" (w/ War Widow) - a cover of the song by Cheap Trick
 2011: "Huggin & Kissin"
 2012: "IFUCKINGLOVEYOU"
 2013: "Side of the Road"
 2013: "Money Rain Down"
 2014: "Huggin and Kissin"
 2015: "It's OK"
 2015: "RCVR (feat. Debbie Gibson)"
 2016: "Steer the Canyon"
 2016: "Bitten by the Apple"
 2017: "Brooks was here2a"
 2019: "Roost"
 2019: "Orinoco Symphony"
 2020: "Summoner"
 2020: "Lord Only Knows"
 2020: "Canary"

Music videos
 2010: "IFUCKINGLOVEYOU"
 2011: "Betamax"
 2013: "Side of the Road"
 2013: "x22
 2013: "Money Rain Down"
 2013: "Love You This Summer"
 2014: "Huggin & Kissin"
2016: "Bitten By The Apple"
2020: "Summoner"
2020: "Lord Only Knows"
2020: "Canary"
2020: "Vessel"

Remixes
 2010: "Houdini" by SONOIO on NON SONOIO
 2011: "Fall" (w/ M83) by Daft Punk on Tron Legacy: R3c0nf1gur3d
 2011: "Inflammable Heart" by Man Without Country on a 3-track single bundle
 2011: "Midnight City (Big Black Delta Remix)" by M83 on Midnight City (Remixes) EP
 2012: "Make It Home (Big Black Delta Remix)" by thenewno2, from their album "thefearofmissingout"
 2012: "More Human Than Human (Big Black Delta Remix)" by White Zombie / Rob Zombie on "Mondo Sex Head"
 2013: "Dear Brother (Denton rework)" by Puscifer, on the "Donkey Punch The Night" EP

References

External links
 
 

Electronic music groups from California
Musical groups from Los Angeles
Musical groups established in 2010
2010 establishments in California